Jacinta Mary Ann Collins (born 4 September 1962) is a former Australian politician who served as a Senator for Victoria from 1995 to 2005 and again from 2008 to 2019. She represented the Australian Labor Party (ALP) and was the party's deputy leader in the Senate from June to October 2013. Collins was a parliamentary secretary in the Gillard Government and Minister for Mental Health and Ageing in the second Rudd Government. She retired from politics prior to the 2019 federal election and accepted an appointment as national executive director of the National Catholic Education Commission on 18 February 2019.

Early life
Collins was born on 4 September 1962 in Altona, Victoria. She grew up in the suburb of Ashwood in Melbourne. She holds the degrees of Bachelor of Arts from Monash University and Bachelor of Social Work from La Trobe University.

Collins worked for the Shop, Distributive and Allied Employees' Association (SDA) from 1980 until her appointment to the Senate in 1995, initially as a social welfare and research officer and then as national industrial officer for five years. She was a delegate to the Australian Council of Trade Unions (ACTU) national congress from 1983 and was elected to the ACTU council in 1993.

Political career

Collins first entered parliament as a Senator for Victoria in 1995. She was appointed to the Senate to fill a casual vacancy caused by the death of Olive Zakharov.  At the time, Collins was the only Victorian female Labor representative.

From October 1998 to November 2001, Collins was Parliamentary Secretary to the Shadow Minister for Industrial Relations and Employment, Training and Population. In 2003, she was named Shadow Minister for Children and Youth.

At the 2004 election, she lost her Senate seat to Steve Fielding of the Family First Party. In 2006 she was preselected for the number one spot on the Labor ticket in Victoria for the 2007 federal election, replacing Senator Robert Ray, who did not contest the election.

Collins was elected, and her term was due to start on 1 July 2008 when Ray's term expired. However, he resigned on 5 May 2008 and she was appointed to the casual vacancy. She was sworn into the Senate later that month.

Collins was promoted to the Second Gillard Ministry as the Parliamentary Secretary for School Education and Workplace Relations on 14 September 2010. In March 2012, she became the first woman to be appointed Manager of Government Business in the Senate following the retirement of Senator Mark Arbib.

On 26 June 2013, following the return of Rudd as leader, Collins was elected Deputy Leader of the Government in the Senate by her parliamentary colleagues. She replaced Senator Penny Wong, who was elevated to Senate leader. This was the first all-female Senate Government leadership team.

Collins was active on many Senate committees, including: 
 Chair of the Employment, Workplace Relations, Small Business and Education References Committee
 Chair of the Economics References Committee
 Chair of the Privileges Committee

Views
Collins was known for her social conservatism, including opposition to assisted reproductive technology for lesbians and single women, opposition to the use of human embryos in medical research, and opposition to same-sex marriage.

Post-politics
In January 2019, Collins announced that she would not contest the next election, citing "family health issues" for her decision to quit politics. She resigned from the Senate on 15 February 2019, and was announced as the new head of the National Catholic Education Commission on the same day. She commenced her role on 18 February 2019.

Personal life
Collins has two children with her husband Daryl, a train driver. She was one of the first female MPs allowed to carry an infant on the floor of parliament.

Collins' first child was born from an unplanned pregnancy when she was 19 years old and given up for adoption.

References

External links
 Summary of parliamentary voting for Senator Jacinta Collins on TheyVoteForYou.org.au
 

1962 births
Australian Labor Party members of the Parliament of Australia
Labor Right politicians
Living people
Members of the Australian Senate for Victoria
Women members of the Australian Senate
Australian trade unionists
Government ministers of Australia
Members of the Cabinet of Australia
Members of the Australian Senate
21st-century Australian politicians
21st-century Australian women politicians
Women government ministers of Australia
20th-century Australian politicians
20th-century Australian women politicians
Monash University alumni
La Trobe University alumni